Norse invaders ruled much of northern England, in the 9th and 10th centuries, and left English surnames of Norse origin in the area now called the Danelaw.

According to Origins of English Surnames and A Dictionary of English and Welsh Surnames: With Special American Instances, English surnames that have their source in the language of the Norse invaders include:
Algar,
Allgood,
Collings,
Dowsing,
Drabble,
Eetelbum,
Gamble,
Goodman,
Grime,
Gunn,
Hacon,
Harold,
Hemming,
Ketellbum,
Knott,
Kronick,
Mainwaring,
Mannerink,
Orme,
Osborne,
Osborn,
Osmund,
Quinnell,
Ransom,
Rogers,
Raven,
Rolf,
Seagrim,
Starbuck,
Thomassen,
Storey,
Thurgood,
Fell,
Tookey,
Toope,
Toovey,
Tovey,
Truelove,
Tubb, and
Turk.

See also
 English surnames of Norman origin

References

English-language surnames